Sidney Verba (May 26, 1932 – March 4, 2019) was an American political scientist, librarian and library administrator. His academic interests were mainly American and comparative politics. He was the Carl H. Pforzheimer University Professor at Harvard University and also served Harvard as the director of the Harvard University Library from 1984 to 2007.

Verba was educated at Harvard College and Princeton University, and served on the faculty of Princeton, Stanford University, and the University of Chicago, before returning to Harvard, where he would spend the rest of his career. As he gave notice of his intention to retire in 2006, Verba observed: "Academics are the only people I can think of for whom this sentence makes sense: 'I'm hoping to get some time off so that I can get some work done.'"

Early life and education
Verba grew up in Brooklyn, New York, where his family ran a "small mom-and-pop dry goods store and always worried about money." After high school he attended Harvard College, where he earned a degree in History and Literature. He began graduate school in the Woodrow Wilson School of Public and International Affairs at Princeton University, intending to join the foreign service, but transferred to Princeton's politics department and earned a PhD.

Early career
After graduate school Verba stayed at Princeton as a research assistant and then assistant and associate professor. In 1964, Verba moved to Stanford University, where he was a full professor for four years, and the University of Chicago for another four years.

Harvard faculty
As a member of the Harvard faculty, Verba's contributions to the life of the scholarly community extended beyond the realm of his academic discipline or his administrative title.  For example, even though he "retired" in 2007, he continued to chair a University Committee on Calendar Reform which had begun its work in 2003. This committee was composed of students (undergraduate and graduate) and faculty members drawn from across the University’s Schools and Faculties.  In 2008, the Committee's efforts reached fruition as Harvard President Drew Faust announced the adoption of a coordinated academic calendar that synchronizes the academic schedules of Harvard’s 13 Schools.  Verba's committee managed to preserve the traditional eight-day reading periods for undergraduates, one of the best features of the former calendar, while eliminating impediments to student cross-registration.  No less important, the Verba committee's work helped to align Harvard’s calendar with those of most colleges and universities in the U.S., making it easier for Harvard students to compete for internships, study-abroad experiences, and work opportunities during breaks and summer vacation.

Librarian
Harvard President Derek Bok named Verba to be director of Harvard University Library in 1984; and  when news of Verba's retirement was received in Massachusetts Hall, Bok observed:
"Professor Verba has led the Harvard libraries during one of their most transformative periods in University's history. ... When I appointed him more than 20 years ago, we were only beginning to realize what the revolution in information technology would mean. Sid's foresight has helped to preserve our valuable collections and opened Harvard's vast resources to scholars, researchers, and students throughout the world. I believe that generations of students will benefit from the doors that Sid has opened." -- Derek Bok.

When Verba retired from the post, he had served longer than anyone else who had held the title of director of the University Library; and not since Thaddeus Harris, whose tenure (1831–1856) straddled the card catalog revolution of the 19th century, had anyone spent so long at the top of Harvard's libraries.

Four specific areas in which Verba's contributions at Harvard have become the model for other academic and research libraries:
 HUL's "Harvard Depository" (HD) -- a "sophisticated way" of addressing the problem of needing to send books off campus.
With a fully digitized collection, "Harvard users gain online access to the full text of out-of-copyright books stored at HD. For books still in copyright, Harvard users could gain the ability to search for small snippets of text and, possibly, to view tables of contents. In short, the Harvard student or faculty member would gain some of the advantages of browsing that remote storage of books at HD cannot currently provide.
 HUL's Digital Initiative—influencing the ways libraries see themselves as responsible for creating and managing digital content.
 "Plans call for the development of a unique union catalog linking the Google search engine with the online HOLLIS (Harvard Online Library Information System) catalog  (http://holliscatalog.harvard.edu), thus furthering retrieval of information on the location and availability at Harvard of works identified through a Google search. This would merge the search capacity of the Internet with the deep research collections at Harvard into one seamless resource-a development especially important for undergraduates who often see the library and the Internet as alternative and perhaps rival sources of information.
 HUL's Open Collections Program -- something of a counterpart to the Google project, though less well known, it aims to digitize and make available university resources on a given topic.
 Women Working, 1800–1930.
 Immigration to the United States, 1789–1930.
 Contagion: Historical Views of Diseases and Epidemic.
 HUL's preservation staff, facilities, and program.
"The possibility of a large-scale digitization of Harvard’s library books does not in any way diminish the University’s commitment to the collection and preservation of books as physical objects. The digital copy will not be a substitute for the books themselves. We will continue actively to acquire materials in all formats and we will continue to conserve them. In fact, as part of the pilot we are developing criteria for identifying books that are too fragile for digitizing and for selecting them out of the project."—Sidney Verba.

Harvard-Google digitization partnership
Verba was ultimately responsible for Harvard's participation in the Google Books Library Project, which involves a series of agreements between Google and major international libraries through which a  collection of its public domain books will be scanned in their entirety and made available for free to the public online. Verba's role encompassed developing digitization protocols, addressing logistical and operations issues, and administering the project. The more difficult part of his job required moderating the institutional debate about anticipated consequences inherent in conventional content-vs.-collection strategies; and sometimes he took on the role of public spokesman.

Sidney Verba Endowment Fund
Friends and colleagues of Sidney Verba established a $2.5 million endowment fund in his honor. The Fund benefits the Harvard University Library, which provides University-wide services, including digital acquisitions and collections, information technology, high-density storage, and preservation. Under the terms creating the fund, Verba himself was given the freedom to designate the purpose of the new endowment.

Political scientist
The central focus of Verba's work as a political scientist can be summed up in one word -- "participation."  Expanding the subject somewhat, that topic might be elaborated to "the issues of political participation by different groups." The great framing question of his work has been, "Whose voice is heard by the government?"  Verba himself argued that issues having to do political participation have become central in America's political discourse today; but he attributes his initial interest in the subject to the prescient encouragement of his mentor, Professor Gabriel Almond at Princeton University. Verba earned his Ph.D. at Princeton in 1959; and in 1963, he was named as a co-author with Almond in The Civic Culture: Political Attitudes and Democracy in Five Nations. It popularized the idea of a political culture – a concept that includes national character and how people choose to govern themselves – as a fundamental aspect of society.  Sidney Verba built on the theory of civic culture that was developed in this book with many of his students and collaborators, including Kay Lehman Schlozman and Henry E. Brady, over the following half century.

In retirement, he continued to explore his longtime interest in "the citizen voice" with a new study of interest groups in the United States, asking whom they represent—ethnic groups, women, trade associations, professions.  His research goal was to produce "a kind of statistical model of what the interest groups in the U.S. look like."

Honors
 American Philosophical Society (2003), member.
Johan Skytte Prize (2002) for distinguished contribution to political science.
 American Political Science Association (APSA), president (1994).
 APSA's Kammerer Prize (1972) for Participation in America.
 APSA's Woodrow Wilson Prize (1976) for The Changing American Voter.
 APSA's James Madison Prize (1993) for career contribution to the discipline.
 National Academy of Sciences (NAS), member.
 NAS Committee on International Conflict and Cooperation, Chair.
 American Academy of Arts and Sciences (AAAS), fellow.
 Center for Advanced Study in the Behavioral Sciences (CASBS), fellow.
 Guggenheim Fellowship (1980).
 Social Science Research Council (SSRC).
 SSRC Policy Committee, Chair.

Selected works
Verba's published writings encompass 83 works in 201 publications in 8 languages and 16,633 library holdings.

 2012 -- The Unheavenly Chorus: Unequal Political Voice and the Broken Promise of American Democracy by Kay Lehman Schlozman, Sidney Verba, and Henry E. Brady
 2011 -- A Life in Political Science Annual Review of Political Science. DOI 10.1146/annurev-polisci-082409-094200
 2005 -- Contest of Symbols: The Sociology of Election Campaigns through Israeli Ephemera by Hanna Herzog (Foreword by Sidney Verba). Cambridge: Harvard University Press.  (paper)
 2001 -- The Private Roots of Public Action: Gender, Equality, and Political Participation. Cambridge: Harvard University Press—with Nancy Burns and Kay Lehman Schlozman.   cloth)  
 1995 -- Voice and Equality: Civic Voluntarism in American Politics. Cambridge: Harvard University Press—with Kay Lehman Schlozman and Henry E. Brady.   (cloth)    (paper)
 1994 -- Designing Social Inquiry: Scientific Inference in Qualitative Research Princeton: Princeton University Press—with Gary King and Robert Keohane.   (cloth)   (paper)
 1987 --  Elites and the Idea of Equality: A Comparison of Japan, Sweden, and the United States. Cambridge: Harvard University Press—with Steven Kelman, Gary R. Orren, Ichiro Miyake, Joji Watanuki, Ikuo Kabashima, and G. Donald Ferree.  (cloth)  ;  (paper)
 1985 -- Equality in America: A View from the Top Cambridge: Harvard University Press—with Gary R. Orren.   (cloth)   (paper)
 1972 -- Participation in America: Political Democracy and Social Equality. New York: Harper & Row—with Norman H. Nie. ;  (cloth). [reprinted by The University of Chicago Press, Chicago.  (paper)]
 1963 -- The Civic Culture: Political Attitudes and Democracy in Five Nations. Princeton: Princeton University Press—with Gabriel Almond. [reprinted by Little, Brown, Boston, 1980.  (cloth)], [reprinted by SAGE Publications, London   (paper)]
 1961 -- Small Groups and Political Behavior: A Study of Leadership. Princeton: Princeton University Press.  (cloth)

References

 Barringer, Felicity. "Washington Talk; Librarian of Congress: New Skills, More Roles," New York Times. May 26, 1989.
 Campbell, Colin. "Tenure Denial of Noted Sociologist Stirs Troubling Queries at Harvard," New York Times. April 21, 1985.
 Cowan, Alison. "For Dealer, Stolen Maps Point Way to Jail," New York Times. June 23, 2006.
 Guernsey, Lisa. "The Library As the Latest Web Venture," New York Times. June 15, 2000.
 Hafner, Katie. "At Harvard, a Man, a Plan and a Scanner," New York Times. November 21, 2005.
 Hafner, Katie. "Libraries Shun Deals to Place Books on Web," New York Times. October 22, 2007.
 "Harvard Cleared In Bias Case." New York Times. April 5, 2005.
 Hays, Constance L. "Tempers Rise Over Fate of Rare Book Collection at Harvard," New York Times. December 29, 1989.
 Herzokovits, Zara. "New type of research journal gaining ground," Boston Globe. July 11, 2005.
 "In Harvard Papers, a Dark Corner of the College's Past," New York Times. November 30, 2002.
  "New Musical Archives For Harvard University," New York Times. December 27, 1984.
 Kelly, Kevin. "Scan This Book!" New York Times. May 14, 2006.
 Keohane, Robert O., Stanley Hoffman, Joseph S. Nye, Jr., Robert D. Putnam, Sidney Verba. "Letter of the Editor: Was This Objectivity?" New York Times. May 17, 1987.
 Oreskes, Michael. "In a Surprise, Voters Say They're Watching a Lot," New York Times. May 15, 1988.
 Page, Tim. "Music Notes: Festival Honors Musical Theater." New York Times. April 14, 1985.
 Pogrebin, Robin. "Renovations to a Study Room by Aalto Splits Harvard Faculty," New York Times. July 10, 2006.
 Riding, Alan. "France Detects a Cultural Threat in Google," New York Times. April 11, 2005.
 Romero, Simon. "Arts in America: Harvard Finds 2 Poems, and a Latin Romance Reignites." New York Times. September 19, 2000.
 Schmidt, Eric. "Half the Electorate, Perhaps Satisfied or Bored, Sat Out Voting." New York Times. November 7, 1996.
 Specter, Michael.  "Computer Speak;World, Wide, Web: 3 English Words." New York Times. April 14, 1996.
 Steinfels, Peter. "Beliefs," New York Times. May 4, 1996.
 Verba faculty bio, Harvard web site
 Walker, Ruth. "Sidney Verba to retire; Appointed in 1984, Verba changed the face of the University Library," Harvard Gazette. September 21, 2006.
 Wyatt, Edward. "Google Adds Library Texts to Search Database," New York Times. November 3, 2005.
 Wyatt, Edward. "Google Library Database Is Delayed," New York Times. August 13, 2005.
 Zexima, Katie. "A Samuel Johnson Trove Goes to Harvard's Library." New York Times. March 18, 2004.

See also
 Google Book Search
 Google Books Library Project

External links
 Installation of President Faust: "Harvard Faculty Greeting,"—video excerpt, Sidney Verba speaking on behalf of the faculty (5 mins).
 Harvard@Home video: "Teaching American Politics"—Professors Waters, Verba, Skocpol
An Annual Reviews Conversations Interview with Sidney Verba (video)

1932 births
2019 deaths
Writers from Brooklyn
American political scientists
Harvard University faculty
Harvard University librarians
Princeton University alumni
Members of the United States National Academy of Sciences
Harvard College alumni